Yuliya Markovna Beygelzimer (born 20 October 1983) is a retired tennis player from Ukraine.

Career

She is perhaps best known for nearly defeating Jennifer Capriati at the 2004 French Open where she was down three games to love in the second set but then swept nine of ten games. She lost the match, having led three games to love in the final set after winning the second 6–4.

On 25 September 2006, she reached her best singles ranking of world No. 83. On 3 April 2006, she peaked at No. 56 in the doubles rankings. In her career, she won 12 singles and 35 doubles titles on the ITF Circuit.

She also won three doubles titles on the WTA Tour: the Tashkent Open in 2003 with Tatiana Poutchek, the 2005 Internazionali di Modena with Mervana Jugić-Salkić, and the 2014 Katowice Open with Olga Savchuk.

She was also the runner-up in doubles finals at the Warsaw Open with Anastasia Rodionova 2001, Sunfeast Open with Yuliana Fedak 2006, Pattaya Open with Vitalia Diatchenko 2009, Malaysian Open with Olga Savchuk 2015.

Beygelzimer has competed for Ukraine both at the Olympics and in Fed Cup.

Playing for Ukraine Fed Cup team, Beygelzimer has a win–loss record of 18–13.

Personal
Yuliya Beygelzimer currently resides in her hometown Donetsk. Coached by father, Emmanuil. Mother is Victoria (engineer). Introduced to tennis at the age of seven when father took her to a local club. Most memorable experience was how patriotic she felt when Ukrainian national anthem was played after she won European Junior Championships in 2000; other great memories were playing Jennifer Capriati on Suzanne Lenglen at Roland Garros, representing Ukraine in Fed Cup and winning WTA doubles title in Katowice. While she was out injured wrote a book in Russian about travelling on the tour, aimed as a guide for young players; currently writes articles for Ukrainian Tennis Magazine.

WTA career finals

Doubles: 7 (3 titles, 4 runner-ups)

ITF Circuit finals

Singles: 20 (12–8)

Doubles: 58 (35–23)

Grand Slam singles performance timeline

External links
 
 
 
 

1983 births
Living people
Ukrainian people of German descent
Ukrainian female tennis players
Olympic tennis players of Ukraine
Tennis players at the 2004 Summer Olympics
Sportspeople from Donetsk